Al-Shaab Cultural & Sports Club was a multi-sports club based in Sharjah, United Arab Emirates. The club was merged with Sharjah FC in 2017.

Achievements
UAE Division One: 2
1992–93, 1997–98

UAE President's Cup: 1
1993

UAE Super Cup: 1
1993

Managerial history
As of 6 June 2014

  Ismail Abdul Karim
  Heshmat Mohajerani (1979–80)
  Frank O'Farrell (1980)
  Mustafa Shawish
  Homayoun Shahrokhi
  Scott Eric Smith
  Paolo Hicki
  Garcia
  Zaki Osman
  Ghanim Sultan
  Faouzi Benzarti
  Kamal Lamawi
  Youssef Zouaoui
  Josef Hickersberger (July 1, 1999 – June 30, 2000)
  Dragan Scocovic (2000–01)
  Reiner Hollmann (2001–02)
  Roland Andersson (July 1, 2002 – July 1, 2003)
  Zoran Filipović (2003–04)
  Jan Versleijen (2004–05)
  Peter Nogly (July 1, 2005 – June 30, 2006)
  Willi Reimann (July 1, 2005–Nov 14, 2006)
  Zlatko Kranjčar (July 1, 2007–Dec 6, 2007)
  Lofti Benzarti (Feb 2, 2008–June 6, 2008)
  Luka Peruzović (July 1, 2008 – June 30, 2009)
  Čedomir Janevski (July 26, 2008–Sept 10, 2008)
  Sérgio Alexandre (July 1, 2012–Dec 16, 2012)
  Marius Șumudică (Dec 27, 2012–Dec 9, 2013)
  Željko Petrović (Dec 23, 2013–2014)
  Tarek El Ashry (Jun 2015–Nov 2015)
  Walter Zenga (Dec 1, 2015–Feb 20, 2016)
  Stefano Cusin (Feb 20, 2016–Jun 30, 2016)
  Ghazi Ghrairi (Jul 2016–Dec 2016)
  Pericles Chamusca (Dec 2016–2017)

References

External links
 Official site

Sport in the Emirate of Sharjah
Shaab, Al
1974 establishments in the United Arab Emirates
Association football clubs established in 1974
Association football clubs disestablished in 2017
Defunct football clubs in the United Arab Emirates